The Federal University of Acre (UFAC) is a Brazilian university with headquarters in Rio Branco, Acre.

The university was founded as a law school in 1964, was reorganized as a university in 1971, and was federalized in 1974. Its enrollment is over 10,000 students in undergraduate and post-graduate programs.

Undergraduate programs

Master programs 
 Master in computer science
 Master in ecology and natural resource management
 Master in environmental sciences
 Master in forestry science
 Master in health and sustainable animal production in the western amazon
 Master in health sciences in the western amazon
 Master in humanities and languages teaching
 Master in performing arts
 Master in plant production
 Master in public health
 Master in regional development
 Master in science, innovation and technology for the amazon
 Master of arts in language, language and identity
 Master's in education
 Professional master’s degree in history teaching
 Professional master’s degree in letters
 Professional master’s degree in mathematics
 Professional master’s degree in physics teaching
 Professional master’s degree in science and mathematics teaching

Doctoral programs

 Plant Production
 Biodiversity and Biotechnology
 Health and Sustainable Animal Production in the Western Amazon
 Collective Health

Admissions
The Federal University of Acre, as well as the other Brazilian federal universities, adopted the National High School Examination (ENEM) in 2012 as a standard of admission.

Notable alumni 
 Binho Marques is a Brazilian politician, and was the Governor of Acre.
 Marina Silva former senator of the state of Acre. 
 Mailza Gomes senator of the state of Acre.
 Iolanda Fleming, former Governor of Acre and first woman to become a state governor in Brazil.

References

External links
UFAC – Universidade Federal do Acre

Acre
Acre (state)
Educational institutions established in 1964
1964 establishments in Brazil